Pearl Cap (foaled 1928) was a French champion Thoroughbred racehorse who is considered one of her country's greatest racing fillies.

Background
Owned and bred by the Esmond family, she was raced under the name of Miss Diana Esmond. She was trained by Frank Carter, a member of the prominent racing family that began in France with Thomas Carter (1805-1879), who immigrated from Peckleton, Leicestershire in England in 1831 and founded the English Racing Colony in Chantilly, Oise.

Pearl Cap is described by France Galop as being "light-framed" and "lop-eared." On the race track, she won races from 1100 metres to 2400 metres. (0.68 to 1.5 miles).

Racing career
Racing at age two in 1930, Pearl Cap won five races, including victories over colts in the Prix Robert Papin as well as in the prestigious (now Group One), Prix Morny. Her performances that year earned her France's champion two-year-old filly honors. In her three-year-old season, the filly again beat her male counterparts in major races. She finished second to Prince Rose in the Grand International d'Ostende at Hippodrome Wellington in Ostend, Belgium, a race her sire Le Capucin won in 1924. After winning three Group One (today) races in France, including the Prix de Diane, in October Pearl Cap defeated Prince Rose at Longchamp Racecourse in Paris when she became the first filly to ever win the Prix de l'Arc de Triomphe.

Breeding record
Retired to broodmare duties, Pearl Cap was a disappointment as a broodmare until the age of sixteen, when she produced the 1947 Epsom Derby winner, Pearl Diver.

Pedigree 

Pearl Cap was inbred 4 × 4 to St. Simon, meaning that St. Simon appears twice in the fourth generation of her pedigree.

References
 Pearl Cap's pedigree and partial racing stats

Specific

1928 racehorse births
Racehorses bred in France
Racehorses trained in France
Arc winners
Thoroughbred family 16-b
Byerley Turk sire line